Tadeja Majerič (born 31 August 1990, in Maribor) is a former tennis player from Slovenia.

Majerič has won nine singles and six doubles title on the ITF Women's Circuit. On 25 November 2013, she reached her best singles ranking of world No. 111. On 28 January 2013, she peaked at No. 227 in the WTA doubles rankings.

Career

2005–2012
Majerič made her debut on the ITF Women's Circuit in April 2005 as a qualifier at a $10k event in Makarska, Croatia. The following year, she reached her first professional final in Zadar, losing in straight sets to Ani Mijačika. 2006 also saw her qualify for the main draw at the Tier IV Slovenia Open in Portorož, defeating Margit Rüütel, Dominika Cibulková and Lucie Hradecká in the qualifying tournament, only to lose to fellow Slovenian Andreja Klepač in round one on her WTA Tour main-draw debut.

In 2007, Majerič played her first matches in national colours for the Slovenia Fed Cup team. In August 2007, she won her first ITF singles tournament in Palić, Serbia. Her second ITF singles tournament win came two years later in Tanjung Selor, Indonesia. After this, she was given a wildcard for the Slovenia Open, losing to world No. 1 Dinara Safina in the first round.

Majerič made her third appearance for Slovenia, in doubles, at the 2010 Fed Cup. Alongside Maša Zec Peškirič in her home town of Maribor, they defeated Japanese team in their World Group II playoff rubber. Majerič's first ITF tournament doubles success came in 2010 at her home tournament, the Infond Open. Partnering Andreja Klepač, they defeated the Russian pair Alexandra Panova and Ksenia Pervak in straight sets. Her third singles tournament win in January 2011 came on the Indian grass courts of Muzaffarnagar. She won her second doubles tournament in Samsun, Turkey, in the summer of 2012, but it wasn't until the end of 2012 that she was successful again, winning both singles and doubles draws in Pune.

2013
The new season turned out to be Majerič's breakthrough year. A good run in the United States in January saw her reach two finals in successive weeks, winning the first, but losing the second, both $25k clay-court events.

In February, she qualified for the main draw of the Qatar Open, but lost, again in the first round, to Hsieh Su-wei. After qualifying failures in Katowice and Marrakesh, she travelled to South America, winning a $25k singles event in Caracas, gaining enough important world ranking points to earn her a spot in qualifying for the French Open. After beating María Irigoyen, she faced Argentinian opposition again, this time in the form of fifth seed Paula Ormaechea. Majerič lost in straight sets. In the run-up to Wimbledon, she reached the final of the Nottingham Challenge, a $75k tournament on grass, where she lost to Elena Baltacha in straight sets. Despite being seeded 23rd at Wimbledon qualifying, she could only reach the second round again, losing to Grace Min.

Further first-round main-draw exits followed at the WTA tournaments in Budapest and Bad Gastein, but, at the Baku Cup, Majerič reached the quarterfinals, winning her first career WTA Tour main-draw matches. As a result, she posted a career-best ranking of world No. 115.

Majerič was seeded 16th in US Open qualifying in August, but lost in three sets to Julia Cohen. Back on the ITF Circuit in September, she made the second round of the Trabzon Cup, but lost in qualifying for Guangzhou and Tokyo on the WTA Tour. Her next event followed at the Governor's Cup in Lagos, the first of two $25k tournaments in the Nigerian metropolis. Here in Africa, Majerič won her third title of the year, defeating fellow Slovenian Dalila Jakupović, in straight sets in the final.

ITF Circuit finals

Singles: 21 (9–12)

Doubles: 16 (6–10)

References

External links

 
 
 

1990 births
Living people
Sportspeople from Maribor
Slovenian female tennis players